Capo d'Orso Lighthouse is an active lighthouse located on the steep  Amalfitan Coast in the municipality of Maiori, Campania on the Tyrrhenian Sea.

Description
The lighthouse is completely automated and is operated by the Marina Militare with the identification code number 2628 E.F.

See also
 List of lighthouses in Italy
 Maiori

References

External links

 Servizio Fari Marina Militare

Lighthouses in Italy
Lighthouses completed in 1862
Lighthouses completed in 1882
1862 establishments in Italy
Buildings and structures in the Province of Salerno
Maiori